Russia (also New Russia) is an unincorporated community within Jefferson Township, in Morris County, New Jersey, United States.

The settlement is located on Russia Brook.

A charcoal iron forge was located in Russia in 1775.

Russia Brook Sanctuary, a  rural park, is located north of Russia.

References

Jefferson Township, New Jersey
Unincorporated communities in Morris County, New Jersey
Unincorporated communities in New Jersey